Vienna Tales is a 1940 musical comedy film directed by Géza von Bolváry and starring Marte Harell, Olly Holzmann, and Hans Moser. The film is set in Imperial Vienna at the beginning of the twentieth century. The film's sets were designed by Hans Ledersteger and Ernst Richter.

Cast

References

Bibliography

External links 
 

1940 films
German historical comedy films
Austrian historical comedy films
1940s historical comedy films
Films set in Vienna
Films set in the 1900s
Films directed by Géza von Bolváry
Films set in restaurants
Austrian musical comedy films
German musical comedy films
German black-and-white films
Austrian black-and-white films
1940 musical comedy films
1940s historical musical films
German historical musical films
1940s German-language films